Iona Lupena is a footballer from the Cook Islands who plays for Manukau City AFC and the Cook Islands national football team.

Manukau City

Suffering an injury while playing for Manukau City in April 2016, the club exigently needed a goalkeeper,
so they brought in replacement Ron Lal; Lupena returned to training in June that year.

References

Cook Island footballers
Cook Islands international footballers
Living people
1984 births
Association football goalkeepers
Expatriate association footballers in New Zealand